Party Round is an American financial service and technology company based in Los Angeles, California that allows startup founders to automate their fundraising process. Its service lets founders create a round, set terms and privately invite investors to participate. It then handles the requisite documents, signatures and capture of raised funds.

History 
Party Round was founded by Jordi Hays and Sarah Chase as an easier way for founders to raise money after Hays had a friend who had wanted to invest $500 in his previous company, only to have his lawyer say it would be more expensive just to run the paperwork for an investment that small.

In February 2022, it was announced that Party Round was named one of the top Los Angeles Startups to Watch in 2022.

Party Round is backed by Andreessen Horowitz, Seven Seven Six, Gradient Ventures, Abstract Ventures, and Shrug Capital.

References 

Companies established in 2021
Financial services companies of the United States
2021 establishments in the United States
2021 establishments in California